Vincent Samuel Aleksander Vanderpool-Wallace (born 11 May 1988) is a Bahamian international soccer player who plays for Bears FC and the national team, as a defender.

International career
He earned his first international full cap against the British Virgin Islands on 26 March 2008.

Personal life
He was born in a family of athletes, with his father, a politician, Vincent a high-jumper and pole vaulter and both his mother Tietchka and sister Arianna standing out in swimming with Arianna an Olympic Games participant.

References

External links

1988 births
Living people
Bahamian footballers
Bahamas international footballers
Bears FC players
Association football defenders
Sportspeople from Nassau, Bahamas
BFA Senior League players
Bahamas under-20 international footballers